Dinosaurs evolved partway through the Triassic period of the Mesozoic era, around 230 Ma (million years ago).  At that time, the earth had one supercontinental landmass, called Pangaea, of which Europe was a part. So it remained throughout the Triassic.  By the start of the Jurassic period, some 30 million years later, the supercontinent began to split into Laurasia and Gondwana.  The largest inlet from Panthalassa, the superocean that surrounded Pangaea, was called the Tethys Ocean, and as this inlet cut deeper into the supercontinent, much of Europe was flooded.

By the Cretaceous, from 145 to 66 million years ago, the continents were beginning to approach their present shapes, but not their present positions, and Europe remained tropical.  At times, it was a chain of island-microcontinents including Baltica and Iberia.

Europe is relatively rich in fossils from the Jurassic-Cretaceous boundary, and much of what is known about European dinosaurs dates from this time. During the Maastrichtian the end of the Cretaceous dinosaurs were dominating western and Central Europe  as the Tremp Formation in Spain dates back to that age. Examples of dinosaurs from Maastrichtian Europe are Struthiosaurus and Canardia.

Criteria for inclusion
The genus must appear on the List of dinosaur genera.
At least one named species of the creature must have been found in Europe.
This list is a complement to :Category:Dinosaurs of Europe.

List of European dinosaurs

Valid genera

Invalid and potentially valid genera 

 Agrosaurus macgillivrayi: Originally mistakenly thought to be from Australia. It is now thought to be more likely from England, and possibly a synonym of Thecodontosaurus. 
 Archaeopteryx: A well-known taxon that combines bird-like pennaceous feathers with the teeth, claws, and long tail of reptiles. It is usually considered a basal avialan but it might also be a non-avian deinonychosaur closely related to dromaeosaurids.
 Balaur bondoc: A strange paravian that possessed a suite of unique features, such as robust muscles, two sickle claws, a didactyl manus, and a deep gut. It may have been an island-dwelling herbivore or omnivore. Studies show it either as a velociraptorine dromaeosaurid or a basal avialan.
 "Bihariosaurus bauxiticus": Although sometimes presented as a valid taxon, it is actually a nomen nudum.
 Ceratosaurus: Some specimens, mostly teeth, from Portugal and Switzerland have been assigned to this genus, but not to a specific species.
 Darwinsaurus evolutionis: May be a synonym of either Hypselospinus or Mantellisaurus.
 Delapparentia turolensis: Said to be indistinguishable from Iguanodon.
 Dinheirosaurus lourinhanensis: Possibly a second species of Supersaurus.
 Gresslyosaurus: Often thought to be synonymous with Plateosaurus, although several differences between them have been noted.
 Huxleysaurus hollingtoniensis: Potentially a synonym of Hypselospinus.
 "Ischyrosaurus": The generic name Ischyrosaurus is preoccupied. The dinosaur may be a synonym of Ornithopsis.
 Koutalisaurus kohlerorum: Usually seen as a synonym of Pararhabdodon, but it could also be its own taxon.
 Kukufeldia tilgatensis: May be a synonym of Barilium.
 "Liassaurus huenei": Could potentially be a second specimen of Sarcosaurus.
 Mantellodon carpenteri: Known from a single specimen from Maidstone affectionally nicknamed a "Mantell-piece". While originally thought to be a specimen of Iguanodon, it may in fact be a synonym of Mantellisaurus.
 "Merosaurus newmani": Originally referred to Scelidosaurus, but it appears to be a theropod. This name remains informal.
 "Newtonsaurus" cambrensis: Said to be an early theropod, but it may be indeterminate within Archosauria.
 Pantydraco caducus: Originally named as a species of Thecodontosaurus, and indeed it may belong to that genus.
 Polacanthoides ponderosus: Potentially a synonym of Hylaeosaurus, Polacanthus or both (a chimera).
 Proplanicoxa galtoni: May be a junior synonym of Mantellisaurus.
 Rhadinosaurus alcimus: Suggested to be synonymous with Struthiosaurus, but it might have been a crocodilian instead.
 Sellacoxa pauli: Possibly synonymous with Barilium.
 Stegosaurus: Some bones from Portugal have been assigned to this genus, but not to a particular species.
 Suchosaurus: Two species have been named, both from teeth. They are indistinguishable from those of baryonychines and may in fact belong to Baryonyx.
 Therosaurus: This genus was named to accommodate the original type species of Iguanodon, I. anglicus. However, it was named before the type species was transferred to I. bernissartensis, so it remains a junior synonym of Iguanodon.
 Valdoraptor oweni: Potentially a junior synonym of Thecocoelurus.
 Wellnhoferia grandis: May be another specimen of Archaeopteryx.

Timeline
This is a timeline of selected dinosaurs from the list above.  Time is measured in Ma, megaannum, along the x-axis.

See also

 :Category: Cretaceous paleontological sites of Europe
 List of European birds
 List of dinosaur finds in the United Kingdom

Notes

 
Europe
†Dinosaurs
Articles which contain graphical timelines